The Charleston Metropolitan Statistical Area, as defined by the United States Census Bureau, is an area consisting of three counties in West Virginia, anchored by the city of Charleston. It is the largest metropolitan area entirely within the state of West Virginia. While the Huntington Metro Area is more populous, it spans three states (West Virginia, Kentucky, and Ohio), and the core county of the Charleston area, Kanawha County, is more populous than the West Virginia portion of the Huntington area.

Charleston is its largest and most populous city in the MSA. Cross Lanes is its most populous census-designated place. As of the 2000 census, the MSA had a population of 309,635 (though new standards set on February 28, 2013 placed the population at 240,000). Prior to the 2000 Census, the Charleston MSA consisted of only two counties – Kanawha and Putnam (the latter of which is now considered part of the Huntington metropolitan area).

Rankings
The population of the Charleston MSA is ranked 151st out of the 363 MSA's. 
The Charleston-Huntington TV Market is ranked 64th out of 210.
The Charleston MSA is ranked 181st out of the 297 Arbitron radio markets.
Out of 280 Metropolitan statistical areas ranked by per capita income, the Charleston MSA is ranked 106th. (Census 2000)
The MSA is 202 out of 280 ranked by median household income. (Census 2000)

Counties
In order of population:

Cities, towns, and other communities

Places with more than 40,000 inhabitants
Charleston (Principal City)

Places with 5,000 to 15,000 inhabitants
Cross Lanes (census-designated place)
Dunbar
Nitro (partial)
South Charleston
St. Albans

Places with 1,000 to 5,000 inhabitants
Alum Creek (census-designated place)
Belle
Chesapeake
Clendenin
Coal Fork (census-designated place)
Culloden (census-designated place; partial)
Elkview (census-designated place)
Madison
Marmet
Montgomery (partial)
Pinch (census-designated place)
Sissonville (census-designated place)
Upper Falls (census-designated place)

Places with less than 1,000 inhabitants
Cedar Grove
Clay
Danville
East Bank
Glasgow
Handley
Jefferson
Pratt
Smithers (partial)
Sylvester
Whitesville

Unincorporated places

Adonijah
Ashford
Bandytown
Barrett
Big Chimney
Bim
Bob White
Bream
Crede
Dille
Elk Forest
Emmons
Floe
Foch
Hillsdale
Independence
Institute

Julian
Little Italy
Mink Shoals
Nellis
O'Brion
Porter
Racine
Rand
Swandale
Uneeda
Valley Fork
Van
Washington Heights
Wharton
Whetstone
Widen

Demographics
As of the census of 2000, there were 309,635 people, 129,229 households, and 88,175 families residing within the MSA. New definitions from February 28, 2013 placed the population at 363,000.
The racial makeup of the MSA was 93.25% White, 4.66% African American, 0.21% Native American, 0.65% Asian, 0.02% Pacific Islander, 0.17% from other races, and 1.04% from two or more races. Hispanics or Latinos of any race were 0.55% of the population.

The median income for a household in the MSA was $29,222, and the median income for a family was $35,735. Males had a median income of $34,105 versus $20,448 for females. The per capita income for the MSA was $16,074.

Highways

Interstates

 Interstate 77
 Interstate 79
 Interstate 64

U.S. Highways

 U.S. Route 60
 U.S. Route 119
 U.S. Route 35

Appalachian Corridors
Corridor G

WV state highways

Colleges and universities
University of Charleston
West Virginia University Institute of Technology
West Virginia State University
Marshall University Graduate College
BridgeValley Community and Technical College
WV Junior College

Combined Statistical Area
The Charleston–Huntington–Ashland, WV–OH–KY Combined Statistical Area consists of the Charleston, WV Metropolitan Statistical Area, the Huntington–Ashland, WV–KY–OH Metropolitan Statistical Area, and the Portsmouth, OH Micropolitan Statistical Area. It spans 12 counties in West Virginia, Kentucky, and Ohio. The population was estimated to be 675,000 as of 2013.

References

External links
The Charleston Area Alliance
List of Micropolitan and Metropolitan areas defined by the U.S. Census Bureau

 
Geography of Charleston, West Virginia
Regions of West Virginia
Boone County, West Virginia
Clay County, West Virginia
Kanawha County, West Virginia
Lincoln County, West Virginia
Putnam County, West Virginia
Metropolitan areas of West Virginia